Tropidosteptes cardinalis is a species of plant bug in the family Miridae. It is found in North America.

References

Further reading

External links

 

Articles created by Qbugbot
Insects described in 1878
Tropidosteptes
Hemiptera of North America